The Pont du Mont-Blanc, sometimes anglicized as Mont Blanc Bridge, is a major bridge in Geneva. It connect the quarters of the left banks of the Rhône to those of the right banks. It is a major north–south road axis in the Canton of Geneva, since its inauguration in 1862. The bridge is about 250 metre-long. The bridge is named after Mont Blanc, the highest massif in the Alps, well visible from Geneva.

The bridge notably marks the transition between Lake Geneva, in particular the Geneva Harbor (Rade de Genève), and the Rhône. On the National Map of Switzerland, the water on its left is indicated as river and the water on its right is indicated as lake. A few metres west of the bridge (in the Rhône) is the Ile Rousseau.

References
The Pont du Mont-Blanc on the National Map of Switzerland

External links

Buildings and structures in Geneva
Bridges in Switzerland
Bridges over the Rhône